Hundred Acres Manor Haunted House is a haunted attraction in the South Hills of Pittsburgh, Pennsylvania. It opened in 2003 on the former location of an earlier haunt called Phantoms in The Park. The main building and surrounding area originally housed a pool and community hall. Hundred Acres Manor is a charity haunted house. Profits go to Animal Friends and The Homeless Children's Education Fund.

References

External links
 http://www.post-gazette.com/pg/09162/976523-55.stm

Haunted attractions (simulated)
Tourist attractions in Pittsburgh
Houses in Pittsburgh